The Circle School is a self-directed democratic school located in Harrisburg, Pennsylvania and founded in 1984, and is operated similarly to the Sudbury Valley School (Framingham, Massachusetts) and Hudson Valley Sudbury School (Kingston, New York).  It enrolls pre-kindergarten through high school aged children. The Circle School currently has approximately 80 students enrolled and 6 full-time staff members.  It is one of three Sudbury-like schools in Pennsylvania and one of the oldest in the world.

Educational method 
The Sudbury Valley model of schooling has two defining characteristics. First, the students are free to spend their time as they choose.  During the hours they are in school students can spend their time engaging in any activity they wish (reading, playing video games, climbing trees, conversing, studying, playing harpsichord etc.).  The only requirements placed on them are that they must follow the rules and that they must do a chore each day (the school has no custodian).  There are no required grades or evaluations, the idea being that every activity students engage in, they engage in because they wish to do so.  The second defining characteristic is that the school is run democratically on a one-person, one vote-model. All the "day-to-day" affairs of the school are governed by a democratic body called the School Meeting. There, decisions are made concerning such things as creating, repealing or amending rules, all aspects of managing the school, suspending and expelling students, etc.  The School Meeting is composed of all students and staff members (teachers) and since the students greatly outnumber the staff members, most of the administrative power lies with the students.  This model of education receives a great deal of skepticism as it is very different than the other methods of teaching.

History 
The Circle School was founded in 1984 by Beth Stone, Jim Rietmulder and Sue Narten.  They were soon joined by Dee Holland-Vogt.  The school was not founded as a democratic school but as an innovative pre-school and elementary school. In 1997 The Circle School added high school grades and has ever since included all grades, pre-kindergarten through high school.

In 2017 the school officially moved to its current location, a new 9,000 square foot building on an 8 acre campus in Harrisburg, PA.

External links 

Sudbury Valley School's Official Website

Democratic education
Circle School, The
Circle School
Schools in Dauphin County, Pennsylvania
Private high schools in Pennsylvania
Private middle schools in Pennsylvania
Private elementary schools in Pennsylvania
1984 establishments in Pennsylvania